Shenzhou 13 was a Chinese spaceflight launched on 15 October 2021 at 16:23 UTC. The flight marked the eighth crewed Chinese spaceflight and the thirteenth flight of the Shenzhou program. The spacecraft carried three People's Liberation Army Astronaut Corps (PLAAC) taikonauts on the second flight to the Tianhe core module, the first module of the Tiangong space station. The launch of the three-person crew with a Long March-2F launch vehicle took place from the Jiuquan Satellite Launch Center. 

Shenzhou 13 successfully undocked from the Tianhe core module on 15 April 2022 at 16:44 UTC and subsequently performed a series of fast return de-orbit procedures which would enable the spacecraft to touchdown in nine hours. The reentry module returned to Earth on 16 April 2022. At 182 days, the mission set a new national human spaceflight duration record, surpassing Shenzhou 12's 92 days as well as becoming China's first dedicated long-duration stay in space.

Background 
The spaceflight is the first of the upcoming missions set to last six months (180 days). After that, the six-month stay aboard the space station will become the normal duration of the astronaut crew in orbit. The flight marks the second of four crewed missions scheduled to dock with the Tiangong space station by the end of construction in 2022.

Mission 

The spacecraft was launched on a Long March-2F launch vehicle in Jiuquan Satellite Launch Center in China's Gobi Desert on 15 October 2021, at 16:23:56 UTC. After about six-and-a-half hours flight it arrived at Chinese space station Tiangong. The mission docked with the Tianhe core module at 22:56 UTC, on 15 October 2021, following the launch and successful docking of Tianzhou 3 on 20 September 2021, the third flight of China's Tianzhou cargo resupply craft.

The crew entered the Tianhe core module later on 16 October 2021, at 01:58 UTC as the second expedition to the Tiangong space station.

At least two spacewalks are planned to occur during the crew's approximately six-month stay in orbit. Shenzhou 14 will be in standby for any possible rescue mission.

Spacewalks 
On 7 November 2021, the first planned spacewalk was carried out by Zhai Zhigang and Wang Yaping as they left the Tianhe core module to conduct extravehicular activities. Wang made history by becoming the first Chinese woman to carry out a spacewalk. They were tasked with conducting the installation of the robotic arm suspension and the adapter and also to do typical tests of equipment. The spacewalk lasted for 6 hours and 25 minutes.

On 26 December 2021, Ye Guangfu and Zhai Zhigang conducted the second planned spacewalk with Wang Yaping assisting the pair from inside the Tianhe module. Ye and Zhai's tasks included deploying an external "panoramic camera C", installing a foot restraint platform and testing various methods of moving objects outside the station. The spacewalk lasted 6 hours and 11 minutes.

Spacecraft 

Shenzhou 13 spacecraft is based heavily on Soyuz MS technology. Shenzhou was approved in 1992 as part of the Chinese space program Project 921, and has a design similar to the Russian Soyuz spacecraft.

In the front of the spacecraft, there is the orbital module which contains an androgynous docking ring based on APAS technology, which is used to dock to the Tianhe core module. In the middle is the reentry module containing the crew which is a scaled-up version of the Soyuz descent module. The rear of the spacecraft is the service module which is equipped with engines, fuel tanks, and solar panels.

The China Academy of Space Technology developed a new technology on Shenzhou 13 for the purpose of radial docking to the bottom of Tianhe, requiring maintenance of continuous altitude and orbit control. This type of docking differed from the front and rear dockings used by the previous Shenzhou 12 as well as Tianzhou 2 and 3 missions, creating a logistic chain of space infrastructure that includes the core module, manned and the cargo spacecraft.

Crew 

The crew was publicly announced in a press conference on 14 October 2021.  

PLASSF Major General Zhai Zhigang is a veteran of Shenzhou 7. Senior Colonel Wang Yaping, who became the first woman to visit the Tiangong Space Station, previously flew on Shenzhou 10. Senior Colonel Ye Guangfu makes his first flight to space. When Shenzhou 13 completed the 180-day mission, Wang had spent about 197 days in space, setting a new record for a Chinese astronaut.

Space lectures 
On 9 December 2021 at 3:55 p.m. Beijing time (7:55 a.m. UTC), the three crew members held a lesson and conducted the scientific experiments from space, as they did in 2013 at Shenzhou 10, to educate, motivate and inspire Chinese younger generation in science and technology for the long term development of the nation. The "main classroom" was in the China Science and Technology Museum in Beijing, and "branch classrooms" were in Nanning, Guangxi Province, Wenchuan, Sichuan Province - where Wang Yaping had flown relief supplies to the earthquake area there in 2008 - Hong Kong and Macau. Wang Yaping conducted the scientific experiments and taught a science lesson to Chinese students by live television broadcast. After a brief presentation of their everyday life and a scientific experiment on cell biology, the crew members performed experiments suitable for high school students on the behaviour of effervescent tablets in weightlessness, the surface tension of water, etc., followed by the opportunity to answer schoolchildren's questions from the classrooms. 

On 23 March 2022 at 3:40 p.m. Beijing time (7:40 a.m. UTC), the three crew members held a second lesson and conducted extra scientific experiments from space as like the previous time. The "main classroom" was in the China Science and Technology Museum in Beijing, with two more "branch classrooms" were in Lhasa, Tibet Autonomous Region and Ürümqi, Xinjiang Uygur Autonomous Region. All three crew members took turns answering questions raised by the schoolchildren after the lecture session was over.

Interaction with American students 
On 10 April 2022, at 3:00 a.m. Beijing time (9 April 2022, 7:00 p.m. UTC), a special question and answer (Q&A) session between the three taikonauts and American students was held in the Chinese Embassy in U.S. in Washington, D.C. The event was officially hosted by the Chinese Ambassador to the United States Qin Gang. Elon Musk was also featured in the event where his pre-recorded remarks on wishes of cooperation of humanity on space in the future was played.

Aftermath 
The follow-up Tianzhou 4 unmanned cargo resupply mission launched on 9 May 2022 for the following Shenzhou 14 mission.

The landing of the Shenzhou 13 crew took place at the Dongfeng landing site in north China's Inner Mongolia Autonomous Region on 16 April 2022. A comprehensive evaluation of the two missions Shenzhou 12 and Shenzhou 13 will then take place. Based on mission results, further expansion of the space station with the two science Laboratory Cabin Module Wentian and Mengtian will be authorized.

References 

2021 in China
Spacecraft launched in 2021
Human spaceflights
Shenzhou program
Tiangong program
Spacecraft which reentered in 2022